The Ruga policy is a Nigerian policy intended to reduce herder–farmer conflicts in Nigeria. Introduced by the Buhari Muhammad Presidency, it is aimed at resolving the conflict between nomadic Fulani herdsmen and sedentary farmers. The policy, which is currently suspended, would "create reserved communities where herders will live, grow and tend their cattle, produce milk and undertake other activities associated with the cattle business without having to move around in search of grazing land for their cows."

Etymology
Ruga (or Rugga) Fulani word for human settlement, and can also be interpreted as the acronym of "rural grazing area"...

History
The policy was developed by the National Livestock Transformation Plan under the Nigeria Economy Council to curb the conflict between farmers and fulani herdsmen.

Criticism
The Government of Nigeria, under the former General Olusegun Obasanjo(Yoruba) and his deputy, Brigadier Shehu Yaradua (Fulani), who conceived the policy, and current president Muhammad Buhari, who also is Fulani, attempted to implement the policy.

Southerners, believed the policy was designed to benefit the Fulanis. So southerners and some religious bodies kicked against Ruga policy; except of course the government and most Northerners who have borne the brunt of the incessant conflicts.

Benue State, which has had a lot of violence between herdsmen and farmers, aligned with its southern counterparts on this issue, notwithstanding that the state is situated along the Middle Belt axis, where its sister states have joined the North to beckon to Ruga. But the Nigerian Government made the policy permanent, to end the incessant conflict killings of farmers and herdsmen in local communities where Fulani herdsmen take their cattle to graze.

The suspension came on a day the Arewa youths, under the aegis of Coalition of Northern Groups, CNG, gave southern leaders 30 days to accept the Ruga Project in peace, and a 30-day ultimatum to President Buhari to implement the programme.

See also
Herder–farmer conflicts in Nigeria

References

Muhammadu Buhari
Conflicts in Nigeria
Public policy in Africa
Politics of Nigeria